Lycksele Municipality is a municipality in Västerbotten County in northern Sweden. Its seat is located in Lycksele.

The municipality traces its history to Lycksele parish, which was in effect during the 19th century with very similar borders and size (5,000-5,500 km²). The whole rural municipality Lycksele became a market town (köping) in 1929 and city in 1946. In 1971 it was amalgamated with Örträsk Municipality.

Generally the northern municipalities, already sparsely populated, have population decreases, but various supporting projects also exist. For instance, a campus of Umeå University is situated here.

Localities
There are two localities (or urban areas) in Lycksele Municipality:

The municipal seat in bold

Transport
There is an airport just south of Lycksele, from which one can reach Stockholm in about 80 minutes.

Previously, the railroad between Umeå and Storuman was the main means of transportation, but its significance has diminished and passenger traffic was discontinued. There are now daily buses to towns like Umeå, Storuman and Tärnaby. In August 2011, passenger train services between Lycksele and Umeå were re-established.

The European route E12, also known as Blå vägen ("The Blue Road") winds along the Ume River and passes through Lycksele.

Sister cities
Lycksele Municipality has three sister cities:

 Mosjøen, Norway
 Ähtäri, Finland
 Lovozero, Russia

References

External links

Lycksele Municipality - Official site

Municipalities of Västerbotten County